Dyadobacter crusticola  is a Gram-negative, psychrotolerant, aerobic and non-motile bacterium from the genus of Dyadobacter which has been isolated from biological soil crusts from the Colorado Plateau in the United States.

References

External links
Type strain of Dyadobacter crusticola at BacDive -  the Bacterial Diversity Metadatabase	

Cytophagia
Bacteria described in 2005
Psychrophiles